Serbia participated at the 2015 European Games, in Baku, Azerbaijan from 12 to 28 June 2015.

The Olympic Committee of Serbia sent a total of 132 athletes to the Games, 79 men and 53 women, to compete in 20 sports. Volleyball, water polo and men's 3 on 3 basketball were the only team-based sports in which Serbia had its representation in these European games.

Notable Serbian athletes featured Olympic taekwondo champion Milica Mandić, who became the nation's flag bearer at the opening ceremony, olympic medalists in shooting Jasna Šekarić, Ivana Maksimović, Andrija Zlatić, Stevan Pletikosić. World number one ranked player in 3 on 3 basketball, Dušan Domović Bulut carried nation's flag at closing ceremony.

Serbia left Baku with a total of fifteen medals (eight gold, four silver, and  three bronze) in nine sports. Shooting athletes won the most medals of all sports, four of which all being gold.

On July 1, 2015 Serbian president Tomislav Nikolić organized reception for athletes and coaches and congratulated them on success.

Medalists

| width="78%" align="left" valign="top" |

| width="22%" align="left" valign="top" |

Archery

Men

Badminton

Men

Women

Basketball (3x3)

Men's tournament

Marko Savić
Dušan Domović Bulut
Marko Ždero
Dejan Majstorović

Pool C

Round of 16

Quarter-final

Semi-final

Bronze-medal match

Boxing

Men

Women

Canoeing

Sprint

Men

Women

Cycling

Road

Men

Mountain biking

Women

Diving

Men

Fencing

Women

Gymnastics

Artistic

Men

Women

Judo

Men

Women

Karate

Men

Women

Sambo

Women

Shooting

Men

Women

Mixed

Swimming

Men

Women

Table tennis

Men

Women

Taekwondo

Men

Women

Triathlon

Men

Volleyball

Men's tournament

Maksim Buculjević
Konstantin Čupković
Milorad Kapur
Milan Katić
Lazar Koprivica
Petar Krsmanović
Dražen Luburić
Mihajlo Mitić
Marko Nikolić
Dušan Petković
Dejan Radić
Milan Rašić
Goran Škundrić
Filip Stoilović

Pool A

|}

|}

Quarterfinals

|}

Women's tournament

Ana Bjelica
Bianka Buša
Marta Drpa
Bojana Živković
Tijana Malešević
Brankica Mihajlović
Slađana Mirković
Brižitka Molnar
Jelena Nikolić
Mina Popović
Silvija Popović
Milena Rašić
Maja Savić
Jovana Stevanović

Pool B

|}

|}

Quarterfinals

|}

Semifinals

|}

Third place

|}

Water polo

Men's tournament

Marko Janković
Petar Kasum
Jasmin Kolašinac
Nikola Lukić
Vladan Mitrović
Dragoljub Rogač
Kristian Šulc
Stefan Todorovski
Marko Tubić
Petar Velkić
Matija Vlahović
Đorđe Vučinić
Uroš Vuković

Group D

Play-off

Quarter-final

Semi-final

Final

Women's tournament

Isidora Damnjanović
Julijana Ilić
Nina Josifović
Vivien Juhas
Janja Kaplarević
Lara Luka
Andrea Marković
Anja Mišković
Nađa Novaković
Anđela Petrović
Teodora Rudić
Aleksandra Ružić
Ljubica Vojinović

Group B

7th–12th Place Classification

Wrestling

Men

Men's Freestyle

Men's Greco-Roman

References

Nations at the 2015 European Games
European Games
2015